The Fraser Valley Historical Railway Society is restoring an old interurban streetcar system, which it plans to operate as a heritage streetcar system, centered on Surrey, British Columbia.  The heritage service began in June 2013.It is one of two operating historical tramways in the province.

System

The interurban runs 4 times a day on weekends; the entire journey takes 55 minutes.

One of two operational interurbans is run on weekend, from stations at Cloverdale to Sullivan.

Volunteers restored the stations to their appearance at the height of the old line's service.

In 2016, the Edmonton Radial Railway Society donated the former Edmonton Transit Service 2001, a 1912 electric locomotive that once ran on this rail line. This locomotive was in turn donated to the Oregon Electric Railway Historical Society in 2017. This is because the Oregon Electric Railway was the original owner of this locomotive.

See also
 British Columbia Electric Railway
 Southern Railway of British Columbia, uses BCER tracks

References

External links

 Fraser Valley Heritage Railway Society – official website

Heritage streetcar systems
Heritage railways in British Columbia